The Taoyuan Confucian Temple is a Confucian temple in Taoyuan District, Taoyuan City, Taiwan.

History
The construction of the temple was completed in 1989.

Transportation
The temple is accessible within walking distance northeast of Taoyuan Station of Taiwan Railways.

See also
 Temple of Confucius
 Furen Temple, Daxi District
 Xinwu Tianhou Temple, Xinwu District
 List of temples in Taiwan
 Religion in Taiwan

References

External links

 

1989 establishments in Taiwan
Confucian temples in Taiwan
Religious buildings and structures completed in 1989
Temples in Taoyuan City